Liam Harrison (born 1953) is an Irish musician and songwriter.  He and his group, Goal Celebrities, had a 1990 number 1 hit in Ireland with "Give It a Lash Jack". The song was dedicated to Jack Charlton, manager of the Republic of Ireland national football team which got to the quarterfinals of the 1990 FIFA World Cup.

In a 2011 interview on RTÉ Irish Television, Jim Sheridan (Film Director) stated that Bono and himself agreed that "Give It a Lash Jack" was the "Greatest Irish song ever written".

Harrison has two children, Kevin (member of Dublin Band 'Dry County') and Deirdre.

He currently plays with Streetwise (Dublin).

References

1990 playlist, RTÉ
The Irish Emigrant, June 4, 1990

External links
Liam Harrison on Myspace

Living people
1953 births
Irish male singer-songwriters
People from Glasnevin